The Colombian Massif (from the Spanish Macizo Colombiano), also known colloquially as Nudo de Almaguer, refers to a group of mountains within the Andes of south central Colombia.  The massif is mainly within the area of the Cauca, Huila, and Nariño Departments.  To the south is the Pasto Massif and to the north begins the Central and Eastern Andes.

Geography

This area is identified as the source of 70% of the Colombian safe water for human consumption and irrigation.  The headwaters of the Magdalena and Cauca Rivers (Caribbean slope), Caquetá and Putumayo Rivers (Amazon Basin) and the Patía River (Pacific slope).

The massif contains 362 high mountain bodies of water, 13 páramos and other ecosystems rich in flora and fauna.  From south to north are the páramos of Cutanga, Letero, Las Papas (Potatoes), Apio (Celery) and Buey (Ox).  Sotará and Puracé are the prominent volcanoes of the area, the latter being within the Puracé National Natural Park.

Very few people have traversed the mountains of this region because it is covered by rugged terrain and an impenetrable and cold páramo environment, both of which are natural guardians which preserve the water sources that provide water for half of Colombia before emptying into the sea.

References

External links 

 Ministerio del Medio Ambiente; Poblacion y ordenamiento ambiental: Macizo Colombiano

Andes
Mountain ranges of Colombia
Mountains of Colombia